Daniel Braun is a German author and computer scientist. He is an assistant professor at the University of Twente.

Life 
Braun was born in Saarbrücken and studied computer science at Saarland University and the University of Aberdeen. He obtained his PhD from the Technical University of Munich in 2021.

Bibliography
 Let’s Play Minecraft: Dein Redstone-Guide, 2015. 
 Let's Play Minecraft: Plugins programmieren mit Java, 2015.  
 Let’s Play Minecraft : Dein Praxis-Guide, 2014. 
 Roboter programmieren mit NXT-G : für LEGO MINDSTORMS NXT, 2011. 
 Roboter programmieren mit NXC für LEGO MINDSTORMS NXT 2nd Edition, 2010.

External links
 Daniel Braun’s page on the site of the German national library
 Daniel Braun’s private page

Living people
German computer scientists
German non-fiction writers
German male non-fiction writers
Year of birth missing (living people)